Northumberland was an electoral district for the Legislative Assembly in the Australian state of New South Wales from 1859 to 1913, in the Newcastle area and named after Northumberland County. It elected two members simultaneously between 1880 and 1887 and three members between 1887 and 1894. Voters cast a vote for each vacancy and the leading candidates were elected.

Members for Northumberland

Election results

References

Former electoral districts of New South Wales
1859 establishments in Australia
Constituencies established in 1859
1913 disestablishments in Australia
Constituencies disestablished in 1913